Oryza grandiglumis is a type of wild rice of the genus Oryza found in tropical countries of South- and Central- America, namely Argentina, Bolivia, Brazil, Colombia, Ecuador, French Guiana, Paraguay, Venezuela, and Peru. They have developed aerenchyma which allows them  to float.

Genomics 
Oryza grandiglumis is a tetraploid of 2n=48. It has a  genome as with several others in the O. officinalis complex.

References

grandiglumis
Rice